A church, church building or church house is a building used for Christian worship services and other Christian religious activities. The earliest identified Christian church is a house church founded between 233 and 256. From the 11th through the 14th centuries, there was a wave of church construction in Western Europe.

Sometimes, the word church is used by analogy for the buildings of other religions. Church is also used to describe the Christian religious community as a whole, or a body or an assembly of Christian believers around the world. 

In traditional Christian architecture, the plan view of a church often forms a Christian cross; the center aisle and seating representing the vertical beam with the bema and altar forming the horizontal. Towers or domes may inspire contemplation of the heavens. Modern churches have a variety of architectural styles and layouts. Some buildings designed for other purposes have been converted to churches, while many original church buildings have been put to other uses.

Etymology

The word church is derived from Old English , "place of assemblage set aside for Christian worship", from the Proto-Germanic kirika.

History

Antiquity

The earliest archeologically identified Christian church is a house church (domus ecclesiae), the Dura-Europos church, founded between 233 and 256.

In the second half of the 3rd century AD, the first purpose-built halls for Christian worship (aula ecclesiae) began to be constructed. Although many of these were destroyed early in the next century during the Diocletianic Persecution. Even larger and more elaborate churches began to appear during the reign of the Emperor Constantine the Great.

Medieval times
From the 11th through the 14th centuries, a wave of cathedral-building and construction of smaller parish churches occurred across Western Europe. Besides serving as a place of worship, the cathedral or parish church was frequently employed as a general gathering-place by the communities in which they were located, hosting such events as guild meetings, banquets, mystery plays, and fairs. Church grounds and buildings were also used for the threshing and storage of grain.

Romanesque architecture 
Between 1000 and 1200, the Romanesque style became popular across Europe. The Romanesque style is defined by large and bulky edifices typically composed of simple, compact, sparsely decorated geometric structures. Frequent features of the Romanesque church include circular arches, round or octagonal towers, and cushion capitals on pillars. In the early romanesque era, coffering on the ceiling was fashionable, while later in the same era, groined vault gained popularity. Interiors widened, and the motifs of sculptures took on more epic traits and themes.

Gothic architecture 

The Gothic style emerged around 1140 in Île-de-France and subsequently spread throughout Europe. Gothic churches lost the compact qualities of the Romanesque era, and decorations often contained symbolic and allegorical features. The first pointed arches, rib vaults, and buttresses began to appear, all possessing geometric properties that reduced the need for large, rigid walls to ensure structural stability. This also permitted the size of windows to increase, producing brighter and lighter interiors. Nave ceilings rose, and pillars and steeples heightened. Many architects used these developments to push the limits of structural possibility, an inclination that resulted in the collapse of several towers possessing designs that had unwittingly exceeded the boundaries of soundness. In Germany, the Netherlands, and Spain, it became popular to build hall churches, a style in which every vault would be built to the same height.

Gothic cathedrals were lavishly designed, as in the romanesque era, and many share romanesque traits. However, several also exhibit unprecedented degrees of detail and complexity in decoration. The Notre-Dame de Paris and Notre-Dame de Reims in France, as well as the San Francesco d’Assisi in Palermo, and the Salisbury Cathedral and Wool Church in England and Santhome Church in Chennai, India shows the elaborate stylings characteristic of Gothic cathedrals.

Some of the most well-known gothic churches remained unfinished for centuries, after the gothic style fell out of popularity. One such example is the construction of the Cologne Cathedral, which began in 1248, halted in 1473, and not resumed until 1842.

Renaissance 

In the 15th and 16th centuries, the change in ethics and society due to the Renaissance and the Reformation also influenced the building of churches. The common style was much like the gothic style but simplified. The basilica was not the most popular type of church anymore, but instead, hall churches were built. Typical features are columns and classical capitals.

In Protestant churches, where the proclamation of God's Word is of particular importance, the visitor's line of view is directed towards the pulpit.

Baroque architecture 

The Baroque style was first used in Italy around 1575. From there, it spread to the rest of Europe and the European colonies. The building industry increased heavily during the baroque era. Buildings, even churches, were used to indicate wealth, authority, and influence. The use of forms known from the Renaissance was extremely exaggerated. Domes and capitals were decorated with moulding and the former stucco sculptures were replaced by fresco paintings on the ceilings. For the first time, churches were seen as one connected work of art, and consistent artistic concepts were developed. Instead of long buildings, more central-plan buildings were created. The sprawling decoration with floral ornamentation and mythological motives raised until about 1720 to the Rococo era.

The Protestant parishes preferred lateral churches, in which all the visitors could be as close as possible to the pulpit and the altar.

Architecture

A common architecture for churches is the shape of a cross (a long central rectangle, with side rectangles and a rectangle in front for the altar space or sanctuary). These churches also often have a dome or other large vaulted space in the interior to represent or draw attention to the heavens. Other common shapes for churches include a circle, to represent eternity, or an octagon or similar star shape, to represent the church's bringing light to the world. Another common feature is the spire, a tall tower on the "west" end of the church or over the crossing.

Another common feature of many Christian churches is the eastwards orientation of the front altar. 
Often, the altar will not be oriented due east but toward the sunrise. This tradition originated in Byzantium in the 4th century and became prevalent in the West in the 8th to 9th century. 
The old Roman custom of having the altar at the west end and the entrance at the east was sometimes followed as late as the 11th century, even in areas of northern Europe under Frankish rule, as seen in Petershausen (Constance), Bamberg Cathedral, Augsburg Cathedral, Regensburg Cathedral, and Hildesheim Cathedral.

Types

Basilica

The Latin word basilica was initially used to describe a Roman public building usually located in the forum of a Roman town. After the Roman Empire became officially Christian, the term came by extension to refer to a large and influential church that has been given special ceremonial rights by the Pope. The word thus retains two senses today, one architectural and the other ecclesiastical.

Cathedral

A cathedral is a church, usually Catholic, Anglican, Oriental Orthodox or Eastern Orthodox, housing the seat of a bishop. The word cathedral takes its name from cathedra, or Bishop's Throne (In ). The term is sometimes (improperly) used to refer to any church of great size.

A church with a cathedral function is not necessarily a large building. It might be as small as Christ Church Cathedral in Oxford, England, Porvoo Cathedral in Porvoo, Finland, Sacred Heart Cathedral in Raleigh, United States, or Chur Cathedral in Switzerland. However, frequently, the cathedral, along with some of the abbey churches, was the largest building in any region.

Pilgrimage church

A pilgrimage church is a church to which pilgrimages are regularly made, or a church along a pilgrimage route, often located at the tomb of a saints, or holding icons or relics to which miraculous properties are ascribed, the site of Marian apparitions, etc.

Conventual church

A conventual church (or monastery church, minster, katholikon) is the main church in a Christian monastery or abbey.

Chapel

Proprietary church

During the Middle Ages, a proprietary church was a church, abbey, or cloister built on the private grounds of a feudal lord, over which he retained proprietary interests.

Collegiate church

A collegiate church is a church where the daily office of worship is maintained by a college of canons, which may be presided over by a dean or provost.
Collegiate churches were often supported by extensive lands held by the church, or by tithe income from appropriated benefices. They commonly provide distinct spaces for congregational worship and for the choir offices of their clerical community.

Evangelical church structures
The architecture of evangelical places of worship is mainly characterized by its sobriety. The Latin cross is a well known Christian symbol that can usually be seen on the building of an evangelical church and that identifies the place's belonging. Some services take place in theaters, schools or multipurpose rooms, rented for Sunday only. There is usually a baptistery at the front of the church (in what is known as the chancel in historic traditions) or in a separate room for baptisms by immersion.

Worship services take on impressive proportions in the megachurches (churches where more than 2,000 people gather every Sunday). In some of these megachurches, more than 10,000 people gather every Sunday. The term gigachurch is sometimes used. For example, Lakewood Church (United States) or Yoido Full Gospel Church (South Korea).

House church
In some countries of the world which apply sharia or communism, government authorizations for worship are complex for Christians. Because of persecution of Christians, Evangelical house churches have thus developed. For example, there is the Evangelical house churches in China movement. The meetings thus take place in private houses, in secret and in "illegality".

Alternative buildings

Old and disused church buildings can be seen as an interesting proposition for developers as the architecture and location often provide for attractive homes or city centre entertainment venues. On the other hand, many newer churches have decided to host meetings in public buildings such as schools, universities, cinemas or theatres.

There is another trend to convert old buildings for worship rather than face the construction costs and planning difficulties of a new build. Unusual venues in the UK include a former tram power station, a former bus garage, a former cinema and bingo hall, a former Territorial Army drill hall, and a former synagogue.  served as a floating church for mariners at Liverpool from 1827 until she sank in 1872. A windmill has also been converted into a church at Reigate Heath.

There have been increased partnerships between church management and private real estate companies to redevelop church properties into mixed uses. While it has garnered criticism, the partnership allows congregations to increase revenue while preserving the property.

See also

 List of largest church buildings
 Pub church
 Shrine
 Tabernacle (Methodist)
 Temple

References

Bibliography

 Erlande-Brandenburg, Alain, Qu'est-ce qu'une église ?, Gallimard, Paris, 333 p., 2010.
 Gendry Mickael, L'église, un héritage de Rome, Essai sur les principes et méthodes de l'architecture chrétienne, Religions et Spiritualité, collection Beaux-Arts architecture religion, édition Harmattan 2009, 267 p.

External links

 New Advent Catholic Encyclopedia – Ecclesiastical Buildings
 New Advent Catholic Encyclopedia – The Church
 Prairie Churches Documentary produced by Prairie Public Television
Iowa Places of Worship Documentary produced by Iowa Public Television
 

 
Building types
Christian architecture
Christian terminology